The Virtuous Island  is a 1956 English adaptation by Maurice Valency of the play Supplément au voyage de Cook  written in 1935 by French dramatist Jean Giraudoux.

Original productions
Supplément au voyage de Cook was translated into English as The Virtuous Island (1956) by Maurice Valency.

Supplément au voyage de Cook  was first performed on 21 November 1935 in Paris at the Théâtre de l'Athénée in a production by Louis Jouvet.

References

Plays by Jean Giraudoux
1935 plays